Man Jiang Hong is the title of a set of Chinese lyrical poems (ci) sharing the same pattern. If unspecified, it most often refers to the one attributed to the Song dynasty general Yue Fei.

Poem and meaning

Authorship controversy
The common belief is that Yue Fei wrote the poem in 1133 at the age of 30 during the Jin–Song Wars. In 1127, the Song emperors Qinzong and Huizong were captured by forces of the Jurchen-led Jin dynasty (this incident is known as the "Humiliation of Jingkang", as mentioned in the poem). Emperor Gaozong retreated to present-day Hangzhou in 1127 and established the Southern Song dynasty.

However, James T. C. Liu, a history professor from Princeton University, states that Yue Fei's version was actually written by a different person in the early 16th century. The poem was not included in the collected works of Yue Fei compiled by Yue's grandson, Yue Ke (岳柯; 1183–post 1234), and neither was it mentioned in any major works written before the Ming dynasty. The section that states the author's wish "to stamp down Helan Pass" is what led scholars to this conclusion. Helan Pass was in Western Xia, which was not one of Yue Fei's military targets. Liu suggests the "real author of the poem was probably Zhao Kuan who engraved it on a tablet at Yue Fei's tomb in 1502, in order to express the patriotic sentiments which were running high at that time, about four years after General Wang Yue scored a victory over the Oirats near the Helan Pass in Inner Mongolia."

Music
The poem has been set to music various times, including a Mandarin song from the 1930s performed by operatic baritone Yi-Kwei Sze in the 1950s. Other singers such as Shi Hong'e, Yang Hongji and Zhang Mingmin have also performed this rendition.

Hong Kong singer Roman Tam sang a Cantonese song "Moon Kong Hung" ("Man Jiang Hong" in Mandarin), composed by Joseph Koo, for the 1983 television series The Legend of the Condor Heroes.

Another Cantonese song of the same title was composed by Kwan Shing-yau and performed by Deric Wan for the 1984 Hong Kong television series By Royal Decree.

See also

Media about Yue Fei
History of the Song dynasty
Jin–Song Wars
Yue Fei Temple
Tomb of Yue Fei
Full River Red, film by Zhang Yimou based on the poem

Notes

References

External links
 Man Jiang Hong translation

Chinese classic texts
Chinese poems
Chinese literature
Chinese patriotic songs
Yue Fei